Donald L. Manford (May 20, 1934 - 1991) was an American politician who served in the Missouri Senate and the Missouri House of Representatives.  He served in the U.S. Navy from 1952 until 1956 during the period of the Korean War.  Manford was previously elected to the Missouri House of Representatives in 1966, serving until 1968.

He died in 1991.

References

1934 births
1991 deaths
20th-century American politicians
Democratic Party members of the Missouri House of Representatives
Democratic Party Missouri state senators
United States Navy sailors
United States Navy personnel of the Korean War